The 1981 Cal Poly Pomona Broncos football team represented California State Polytechnic University, Pomona as a member of the California Collegiate Athletic Association (CCAA) during the 1981 NCAA Division II football season. Led by second-year head coach Roman Gabriel, Cal Poly Pomona compiled an overall record of 4–7 with a mark of 1–1 in conference play, placing second in the CCAA. The team was outscored by its opponents 236 to 175 for the season. The Broncos played home games at Kellogg Field in Pomona, California.

This was the last season for that the CCAA sponsored football. The Broncos played 13 seasons, from 1969 to 1981, in the conference. All three football members (Cal Poly Pomona, Cal Poly, and Cal State Northridge) moved their programs to the new Western Football Conference (WFC) in 1982.

Schedule

References

Cal Poly Pomona
Cal Poly Pomona Broncos football seasons
Cal Poly Pomona Broncos football